The surname Hallifax may refer to:

David Hallifax (1927–1992), Constable and Governor of Windsor Castle 
Edwin Richard Hallifax (1874-1950), senior official in Hong Kong
Guy Hallifax (1884-1941), South African military commander
Samuel Hallifax (1733–1790), English bishop and academic
Thomas Hallifax (1722-1789), English politician
Tom Hallifax (b. 1965), Anglo-Irish contemporary artist

See also
Halifax (disambiguation)